Bachama (Bachama) is an Afro-Asiatic language spoken in Nigeria in Adamawa State principally in the Numan, Demsa and Lamurde Local Government Areas by the Bwatiye people. The  Dialects are Mulyen, Opalo, and Wa-Duku. Bachama-Yimburu appears to be a closely related but distinct language.  Bachama is used as a trade language. It is often considered the same language as Bata. There are also Egyptian, South African and Ethiopian descendants that settled and are Nigerian citizens.

Numerals
Bachama has a decimal/quinary number system, with both 5 and 10 as bases:

8 is 4-4, 6 and 7 are based on adding to 5, and 9 means '(10) less 1'.

Example Texts in Bacama 
 Gibo ma ḅa ḍa motso da Pwa tsi ne ndso-nogi ka nji-nogi ka nogi. - Mark 3:35 (GWVS 1915)

Other Resources available in Bacama 
Audio Recordings in Bacama

Notes 

Biu-Mandara languages
Languages of Nigeria